Nils Sundh (16 October 1898 – 25 October 1969) was a Swedish ski jumper. He competed in the individual event at the 1924 Winter Olympics.

References

1898 births
1969 deaths
Swedish male ski jumpers
Olympic ski jumpers of Sweden
Ski jumpers at the 1924 Winter Olympics
Sportspeople from Stockholm